Women's College Hospital is a teaching hospital in downtown Toronto, Ontario, Canada. It is located at the north end of Hospital Row, a section of University Avenue where several major hospitals are located.  It currently functions as an independent ambulatory care hospital. The Chief of Staff is Dr. Sheila Laredo and the physician-in-chief is Dr. Paula Harvey.

Women's College Hospital maintains a focus on women's health, research in women's health, and ambulatory care. It was recognized as the only collaborating centre in women's health the Western Hemisphere designated by the World Health Organization.

Women's College Hospital is associated with Women's College Research Institute, Women's College Hospital Foundation and Women's Health Matters, a bilingual consumer website on women's health and lifestyle issues.

History
Women's College Hospital began as Woman's Medical College in 1883. On June 13, 1883, Dr. Emily Stowe (1831–1903) the second woman licensed to practice medicine in Canada – led a group of her supporters to a meeting at the Toronto Women's Suffrage Club, stating "that medical education for women is a recognized necessity, and consequently facilities for such instruction should be provided." The motion was seconded adding "that the establishment of such a school was a public necessity and in the interests of the community."

Less than six months after this meeting, on October 1, 1883, Toronto Mayor A.R. Boswell formally opened Woman's Medical College.

Women's College Hospital leaders
Dr. Jessie Gray – considered at the time to be one of the top cancer surgeons in North America, she was the first woman to earn a Master of Surgery degree in Canada
Dr. Marion Powell – a leader in raising  consciousness in women's sexual health
Dr. Henrietta Banting – spearheaded the use of mammography
Dr. Marion Hilliard – collaborated in the development of a simplified Pap test
Dr. Ricky Kanee Schachter – was the first woman to lead an academic division of dermatology
Dr. Minerva Reid – was the first female Chief of Surgery in North America

Ontario Medical College for Women
In 1895, the College amalgamated with its sister institution in Kingston, Ontario, and changed its name to the Ontario Medical College for Women. A practical experience clinic called the Dispensary was opened in Toronto in 1898. The clinic allowed female patients to obtain the services of women doctors in a field dominated by men. At the time, services were provided regardless of the patient's ability to pay and medical advice was always free.

In 1906, the University of Toronto opened its doors to permit women to study medicine, and the Ontario Medical College for Women closed. The Dispensary remained open and continued to prosper in the city.

Recent history
Women's College Hospital moved to its current location in Toronto in 1935, and became a teaching hospital affiliated with the University of Toronto in 1961. Later, the hospital merged with Sunnybrook Hospital and the Orthopedic and Arthritic Hospital in 1998 under the provisions of Ontario Bill 51, becoming Sunnybrook and Women's College Health Sciences Centre.  In 2006, they de-amalgamated and Women's College Hospital reverted to its original name. During the SARS outbreak of 2003, while still part of the erstwhile "Sunnybrook and Women's College Health Sciences Centre", the Women's College site housed the first ambulatory SARS clinic in Canada. Meanwhile, the Sunnybrook site housed both the first in-patient SARS unit and Intensive Care Unit for SARS in Canada.

The hospital was designated a National Historic Site of Canada in 1995.  A plaque was erected by Historic Sites and Monuments Board of Canada at the Women's College Hospital, Grenville St., Toronto.

About
Women's College Hospital collaborated in the invention of the simplified Pap test, opened Ontario's first regional Sexual Assault Care Centre and was the first hospital in the province to use mammography as a diagnostic tool to detect breast cancer. As of 2012, it is Ontario's first and only independent ambulatory care centre. Ambulatory care refers to surgeries, diagnostic procedures and treatments that do not require overnight hospitalization. That means patients can be released within 18 hours, and can recover at home.

Complex

WCH's current site consisted of three wings built in 1935, 1956 and 1971 which were all demolished as part of a complete rebuild which was completed in 2015.

The 1935 wing was a 10-storey Art Deco building that was torn down despite historical designation for WCH.

Education
Women's College Hospital is a teaching hospital affiliated with the University of Toronto. Research at the hospital, university and research institute are focused around sex and gender differences in physiology and social roles, which cause women to have different health-care needs than men.

WCH received a $500,000 grant from the Public Health Agency of Canada's Immunization Partnership Fund to implement a vaccine education program targeted towards non-physician health care workers in long-term facilities and at-home care services.

Research
The Women's College Research Institute (WCRI) is the only one of its kind at a Canadian hospital devoted to women's health. International researchers study breast cancer, musculoskeletal health, older women's health and the impact of violence on women's lives.

WCRI scientist Dr. Steven Narod was part of the team that discovered the BRCA1 and BRCA2 genes as breast cancer risks– one of the most important breakthroughs in cancer research. He has changed the way international health professionals understand and test for genes associated with breast and ovarian cancer.

Treatment/clinics
After Cancer Treatment Transition Clinic: Women's College Hospital and Princess Margaret Hospital created Canada's only After Cancer Treatment Transition Clinic (ACTT) to address the health-care needs of cancer survivors.
Virtual Ward: With funding from the Toronto Central Local Health Institution and the Ontario Ministry of Health and Long-Term Care, several hospitals have partnered with the Toronto Central Community Care Access Centre to create the first virtual ward in North America. The Virtual Ward uses a health team to work with patients who cannot come to the hospital on a regular basis.
CACE Complex Care Clinic: In collaboration with the University of Toronto, Women's College Hospital built a Centre for Ambulatory Care and Education (CACE) Complex Care Clinic. The clinic opened in 2015 and will focus on providing ambulatory care. It will use an interdisciplinary approach to medicine.
Bay Centre for Birth Control: The Bay Centre specializes in sexual and reproductive health care for women in Ontario. Services include contraceptive health care, reproductive health care, abortion care, sexual health care, and colonoscopy services. It is located near the main hospital at 790 Bay Street, Toronto.

Women's College Hospital timeline

See also
Elizabeth Bagshaw
Margaret McKellar
Helen Bell Milburn
Hannah Emily Reid
Ricky Kanee Schachter
Emily Stowe
Marjorie Davis

References

External links
 Women's College Hospital
Women's Health Matters

Hospitals in Toronto
Hospitals affiliated with the University of Toronto
Hospitals established in 1883
National Historic Sites in Ontario
Public–private partnership projects in Canada
Women in Toronto